Min Pale (1330 –  1402) was governor of Paukmyaing in the Kingdom of Ava in the late 14th century. He was a grandson of King Uzana I of Pinya, and was one of the four top commanders of King Swa Saw Ke of Ava. He was the paternal grandfather of King Mohnyin Thado. All the kings of the Konbaung Dynasty claimed descent from him.

Brief
According to the 18th century Alaungpaya Ayedawbon chronicle, Min Pale's father Yandathu was descended from kings Naratheinkha and Sithu II of Pagan Dynasty while his mother Mway Medaw was a daughter of King Uzana I of Pinya. The 19th century Hmannan Yazawin chronicle identifies his personal name as Nga Shwe. He had at least one younger sister named Saw Khit Ke. Pale was married to Shwe Einthe, daughter of King Kyawswa I of Pinya (r. 1344–50). The couple had at least one son, Saw Diga.

Kyawswa I appointed his son-in-law governor of Paukmyaing, a small town in modern Kyaukse Township. He was reappointed at the position at the accession ceremony of King Swa Saw Ke. Pale rose to become one of the four highest ranking generals in the Royal Army although his ascent to the top echelon came late in his life. He was first mentioned as a commander only in 1390.

Pale most probably had died by 1402 when King Minkhaung I appointed Sithu as the new governor of Paukmyaing. He was the paternal grandfather of King Mohnyin Thado (r. 1426–39). King Alaungpaya, the founder of Konbaung Dynasty, claimed descent from him.

Military service
The following is his military service as a commander.

Ancestry
The governor was descended ultimately from the Pagan royalty.

Notes

References

Bibliography
 
 
 

Burmese generals
Ava dynasty